The Aspen Shale is a geologic formation in Wyoming. It preserves fossils dating back to the Cretaceous period.

See also

 List of fossiliferous stratigraphic units in Wyoming
 Paleontology in Wyoming

References
 

Shale formations of the United States
Cretaceous geology of Wyoming